Doordarshan Kendra Pondicherry was inaugurated on 14 May 1976. The service has been extended to the entire state in a phased manner by installing terrestrial transmitters of different capacities (HPTs, LPTs, VLPTs) in different parts of the state.

The local DD Pondicherry service caters to the needs of the populace living in areas falling within the reach of a particular transmitter through area specific programmes in the local languages and dialects.

DD Pondicherry presents programs such as documentaries and live-on-phone hosts consisting of experts in various fields.
 
It is narrow cast between 12:30 AM and 13:30 PM on DD Chennai, Podhigai TV.

DD Pondicherry is on the eastern side of Tamil Nadu and also used for narrowcasting for the benefit of farmers and the general public in and around Pondicherry State.

See also
 List of programs broadcast by DD National
 All India Radio
 Ministry of Information and Broadcasting
 DD Direct Plus
 List of South Asian television channels by country
 Media in Chennai

External links 
 Official website
 Doordarshan Official Internet site
 Doordarshan news site
 An article at PFC

Doordarshan
Mass media in Puducherry
Foreign television channels broadcasting in the United Kingdom
Television channels and stations established in 1976
Indian direct broadcast satellite services